Apostolos Kontos (Greek: Απόστολος Κόντος) (born on November 22, 1947) is a Greek former professional basketball player and coach. He is considered to be one of the great players in Panathinaikos Athens history, and is the club's all-time leading scorer. He was also a long-time member of the Greece men's national basketball team. He played at the shooting guard and small forward positions, with small forward being his main position.

Professional career
Kontos began his club playing career with Ionikos NF. With his next club, Panathinaikos Athens, he won 9 Greek League championships (1971, 1972, 1973, 1974, 1975, 1977, 1980, 1981, 1982) and 3 Greek Cups (1979, 1982, 1983). He finished his playing career with AEK Athens.

In the top-tier level Greek League, he scored a total of 8,712 points, which is the 4th most total points scored in the competition, since the 1963–64 season.

National team career
As a member of the Greek Under-18 junior national team, Kontos won the silver medal at the 1970 FIBA Europe Under-18 Championship. 

Kontos also played in 114 games with the Greek men's national basketball team, scoring a total of 1,114 points. He played at the 1972 Pre-Olympic Tournament, the 1973 EuroBasket, and the 1975 EuroBasket with Greece's senior national team. He also won the bronze medal at the 1971 Mediterranean Games.

Coaching career
After his playing career ended, Kontos became a basketball coach. He was the head coach of AEK Athens during the 1993–94 season.

Awards and accomplishments

Playing career
9× Greek League Champion: (1971, 1972, 1973, 1974, 1975, 1977, 1980, 1981, 1982)
3× Greek Cup Winner: (1979, 1982, 1983)
 4th all-time leading scorer of the Greek Basketball Championship, with 8,712 total points scored in the Greek A National League (1963–64 season to present).

References

External links
FIBA Profile
Hellenic Basketball Federation Profile 
Τα “κανόνια” του ελληνικού Πρωταθλήματος: Απόστολος Κόντος 

1947 births
Living people
AEK B.C. coaches
AEK B.C. players
Dafni B.C. coaches
Greek basketball coaches
Greek Basket League players
Greek men's basketball players
Ionikos N.F. B.C. players
Milon B.C. coaches
Pagrati B.C. coaches
Panathinaikos B.C. players
Shooting guards
Small forwards
Mediterranean Games medalists in basketball
Mediterranean Games bronze medalists for Greece
Competitors at the 1971 Mediterranean Games
Basketball players from Athens